The Larry H. Miller Tour of Utah, is an annual multi-day road cycling race; traversing the states of Idaho, Utah, and Wyoming. Since the 2011 edition, the tour holds UCI classification (currently as 2.HC). Between five and six UCI WorldTeams compete annually.

History
The Tour of Utah began in 2000, as an amateur race. It was originally called the Thanksgiving Point Stage Race. It received its present name in 2004. Originally organized by cycling enthusiasts, the race was purchased by the Larry H. Miller Group of Companies, Larry H. Miller's holding company, in 2007. The tour received UCI classification (2.2) in 2006.  However, the 2007 edition was postponed due to lack of sponsorship.

The 2008 and 2009 editions subsequently returned to United States National Racing Calendar. After the 2010 edition, the Tour of Utah was placed in the UCI America Tour, and regained UCI classification (2.1). Five UCI ProTeams were among the sixteen teams competing in the 2011 and 2013 editions, and six were among the seventeen teams competing in the 2012 edition. In the 2014 edition, six of the sixteen teams were UCI ProTeams. In 2015, the Tour rating was elevated to 2.HC, one of the few UCI-sanctioned, multi-stage, pro cycling events in North America.

In 2010, only 71 of the initial 140 riders finished. After receiving 2.1 status in 2011, a stronger field participated; 88 of the initial 120 competitors finished. In September 2014, it was announced that the race was promoted to 2.HC status, from 2015 and onwards.

With the Tour of California going on hiatus in 2020, the United States has no event that is part of the UCI World Tour. This makes the Tour of Utah the highest level multi-day road cycling race in the United States. Additionally, it is tied with the one-day Maryland Cycling Classic as the highest overall road cycling race in the United States.

The 2020 and 2021 editions of the Larry H. Miller Tour of Utah were cancelled due to safety concerns surrounding the COVID-19 pandemic.

Tour of Utah operations were licensed to Medalist Sports in 2021. The event was cancelled again for 2022. On December 22, 2021 Medalist Sports stated it is no longer pursuing the return of the tour of Utah.

Results

General classification

Sprints classification

Youth classification

Mountains classification

Teams classification

Notes

References

External links

2006 Tour at CyclingNews

 
Cycle races in the United States
Sports in Utah
Recurring sporting events established in 2004
UCI America Tour races
2004 establishments in Utah
Summer events in the United States